Max Ellis may refer to:

 Max Ellis (footballer) (born 1933), former Australian rules footballer
 Max Ellis (cricketer) (born 1991), cricketer from Guernsey
 Max Mapes Ellis (1887–1953). American ichthyologist